The École nationale supérieure d'architecture de Clermont-Ferrand or ENSACF is a French architectural school located in the city of Clermont-Ferrand in the Auvergne-Rhône-Alpes region of France. The school was founded in 1970.

External links
 Ecole Nationale Supérieure d'Architecture de Clermont-Ferrand

Architecture schools in France
Educational institutions established in 1970
Universities and colleges in Clermont-Ferrand